The William James Prize for Contributions to the Study of Consciousness is an award given by the Association for the Scientific Study of Consciousness.

Each year one prize is awarded for an outstanding published contribution to the empirical or philosophical study of consciousness by a graduate student or postdoctoral scholar within five years of receiving a PhD or other advanced degree.

The prize consists of:
An award of $1000(USD);
Invitation to present a plenary address at the next meeting of the ASSC;
Lifetime membership in the ASSC.

External links

Papers awarded 
 Award for 2016: "Untangling brain-wide dynamics in consciousness by cross-embedding" by Satohiro Tajima and colleagues (PLoS Computational Biology, 11(11): e1004537, 1-28)
 Award for 2015: "Unconscious information changes decision accuracy but not confidence" by Alexandra Vlassova and colleagues (PNAS, 2014, 111(45), 16214–16218)
 Award for 2014: "Priming of awareness or how not to measure visual awareness" by Zhicheng Lin and colleagues (Journal of Vision, 2014, 14(1):27, 1-17)
 Award for 2013: "An accumulator model for spontaneous neural activity prior to self-initiated movement" by Aaron Schurger and colleagues (PNAS, 2012, 109(42): E2904-E2913)
 Award for 2012: "Relating Introspective Accuracy to Individual Differences in Brain Structure" by Stephen Fleming and colleagues (Science, 2010, 329(5998), 1541–43)
 Award for 2011: "Perception and Iconic Memory: What Sperling Doesn’t Show" by Ian Phillips and colleagues (Mind & Language,  2011, 26(4), 381–411)
 Award for 2010: "The brain under self-control: modulation of inhibitory and monitoring cortical networks during hypnotic paralysis" by Yann Cojan and colleagues (Neuron, 2009, 62(6), 862-75)
 Award for 2009: "The functional impact of mental imagery on conscious perception" Joel Pearson and colleagues (Current Biology, 2008, 18, 982-986)
 Award for 2008: "Continuous flash suppression reduces negative afterimages" by Naotsugu Tsuchiya and colleagues (Nature Neuroscience, 2005, 8(8), 1096–1101)
 Award for 2007: "Cerebral bases of subliminal and supraliminal priming during reading" by Sid Kouider and colleagues (Cerebral Cortex, 2007, 17, 2019–2029)
 Award for 2006: "Traveling waves of activity in early visual cortex during binocular rivalry" by Sang-Hun Lee and colleagues (Nature Neuroscience, 2005, 8, 22-23)
 Award for 2005: "Attention to Intention" by Hakwan Lau and colleagues (Science, 2004, 303, 1208–1210).
 Award for 2004: "Brain Function in the Vegetative State" by Steven Laureys and colleagues (Acta Neurologica Belgica, 2002, 102, 177–185).

Useful links 
 William James Prize homepage

Consciousness studies
American psychology awards